Huang Zichang (born 4 April 1997) is a Chinese footballer who currently plays for Henan Longmen in the Chinese Super League.

Club career
Huang Zichang started his football career when he signed his first professional contract with Chinese Super League side Jiangsu Suning in 2016. He was promoted to the first team squad by manager Choi Yong-soo in the 2017 season. Huang made his senior debut and scored his first goal in a league game on 4 March 2018 in a 3–1 away win against Guizhou Hengfeng. This would be followed with his second goal in his fifth appearance on 6 April 2018 in a 2–0 away win against Guangzhou R&F. On 22 April 2018 a third goal in seven league appearances would be scored by Huang in a 5–1 home win against Shanghai Greenland Shenhua. On 1 May 2018, Huang scored the deciding penalty in the fifth round of 2018 Chinese FA Cup as Jiangsu beat Tianjin Quanjian 8–7 on penalties. Although he suffered an ankle injury in August 2018, Huang scored five goals in 19 appearances in his debut season, winning the Chinese Football Association Young Player of the Year award. On 14 February 2019, he extended his contract with the club until the end of the 2024 season. This would be followed by the 2020 Chinese Super League title when he would win the clubs first league title with them.

International career
Huang made his debut for the Chinese national team on 26 May 2018 in a 1–0 win against Myanmar.

Career statistics

Club statistics
.

International statistics

Honours

Club
Jiangsu Suning
Chinese Super League: 2020

Individual
Chinese Football Association Young Player of the Year: 2018
Chinese Super League Team of the Year: 2018

References

External links
 
 

1997 births
Living people
Chinese footballers
People from Putian
Footballers from Fujian
Jiangsu F.C. players
Chinese Super League players
Association football midfielders
China international footballers
Footballers at the 2018 Asian Games
Asian Games competitors for China
21st-century Chinese people